Linde Hydraulics is a manufacturer of heavy duty drive systems consisting of hydraulics, power transmissions, and electronics. The company's product offerings include hydraulic pumps and motors, directional control valves, power transmissions as well as peripheral electronics and software. 
Its products are used in agricultural, construction, forestry, landscaping, marine, material handling, mining, municipal, and stationary segments, as well as mobile lifting platforms.

History

Linde Hydraulics from 1904 to 2020.

Segments

Agricultural
Construction
Forestry
Industrial
Material Handling
Mining
Municipal
Offshore
Oil & Gas

Products

Pumps
Closed Circuit 
Open Circuit

Motors
Variable Displacement
 Swash Plate
 Bent Axis
Self-Regulating 
Fixed Displacement

CVT
Classic Hydrostat
Hydrostatic Variator for Internal Transmission Mount
Hydrostatic Variator for External Transmission Mount

Power Transmissions
Swing Drives
Track Drives
Wheel Drives

Valves
Directional Control Valves
Valve blocks
Valve modules

Electronics
Electronic control units (ECU)
Pilot control devices
Sensors & Actuators
Software

Services
Repair of hydraulic pumps and motors
Remanufacturing of hydraulic units
Sale of spare parts

Locations
Linde Hydraulics has 4 production plants in Germany (2x Aschaffenburg, Kahl and  Ballenstedt) and a 5th factory in Weifang, China. The company has subsidiaries in Europe, United States, South America and China as well as a global network of sales and service partners.

References

External links

Engineering companies of Germany
Manufacturing companies of Germany
Companies based in Bavaria
Manufacturing companies established in 1904
German brands